Hartvig Sverdrup Eckhoff (30 December 1855 – 17 February 1928) was a Norwegian architect.

He took his education at the Technical University of Munich, and opened an architect's office in Stavanger in 1881. He was assigned to design several important city buildings; the first was Rogaland Teater, erected in 1883. He later designed the Stavanger Gymnastics Association (1891), Stavanger Museum (1893) and Stavanger Hospital (1897). All these buildings are characterized by historicism, Neo-Renaissance architectural revival style, the latter with a different expression, performed mostly in raw red brick. Eckhoff designed several villas in western Norway, and distinguished himself as a church architect. His designs included Haukedalen church in Førde (1885), Bore in Klepp (1891), Skånevik ( 1900), and Ask (1908). Besides his architect work, he was a teacher at Stavanger Cathedral School for thirty-three years.

References

1855 births
1928 deaths
Norwegian architects
Technical University of Munich alumni
Norwegian expatriates in Germany
People from Stavanger